Colin Smith (born 23 September 1983 in Harare, Zimbabwe) is a Zimbabwean-born British rower, Olympic silver medallist and three times an Oxford Blue. He now currently pursues a job as a lawyer.

Education
Colin Smith was educated at the Prince Edward School, Zimbabwe and St Catherine's College, Oxford (M.'03) where he read geography. He subsequently read for an MBA at the University of Oxford Saïd Business School in 2009 and finished a Graduate Diploma in Law in 2010.

The Boat Race
Whilst at Oxford University, Smith was a member of Oxford University Boat Club and took part in The Boat Race in 2004 and 2006. He returned in 2009, as president and won a second Boat Race. In 2009, Colin along with George Bridgewater, Alex Hearne and Ante Kusurin graduated with an MBA from the Said Business School.
 2009 OUBC — Won (two seat)
 2006 OUBC — Won (two seat)
 2005 Isis — Lost (stroke seat)
 2004 OUBC — Lost (stroke seat)

International Rowing Career

Olympic Games
 2008 Beijing — Silver, Men's Eight (stroke seat)

World Championships
 2007 Munich — Bronze, Coxless Pair (stroke seat)
 2006 Eton — 6th, Coxless Pair (bow seat)
 2005 Gifu — 12th, Single Scull

World Cups
 2008 Lucerne — 8th, Coxless Four (stroke seat)
 2008 Munich — Silver, Eight (stroke seat)
 2007 Amsterdam – Gold, Eight (two seat)
 2007 Linz – Gold, Coxless Pair (bow seat)
 2006 Lucerne — Silver, Coxless Pair (bow seat)
 2005 Munich — 11th, Double Scull (stroke seat)
 2005 Eton — 13th, Single Scull

World Under 23 Regatta
 2005 Amsterdam — 4th, Double Scull (bow seat)
 2004 Poznań — 2nd, Single Scull

References
 

1983 births
Living people
British male rowers
Rowers at the 2008 Summer Olympics
Olympic silver medallists for Great Britain
Olympic rowers of Great Britain
Alumni of St Catherine's College, Oxford
Alumni of Saïd Business School
Oxford University Boat Club rowers
Olympic medalists in rowing
Alumni of Prince Edward School
Medalists at the 2008 Summer Olympics
Members of Leander Club
World Rowing Championships medalists for Great Britain